Gediminas Budnikas (born February 11, 1944 in Paąžuoliai) is a retired Lithuanian basketball player, most notable for his career with Žalgiris from 1964 to 1973.

Biography
Both partisans, his parents died on July 26, 1945, fighting for Lithuanian freedom. Gediminas and his brothers, Juozas and Antanas, grew up with relatives. In 1959, Gediminas graduated eight classes at Kaunas IV secondary school and finished Kaunas Food Industry Technical College. In 1979, he graduated from Vilnius University Kaunas Faculty of Humanities and, in 2005, in public administration at Kaunas University of Technology.

Professional sports career
In 1962, Budnikas was invited to join Žalgiris team. In 1962-1974 he was a member of the  Lithuanian Soviet Socialist Republic national team. In 1973, he became a USSR basketball championship prizewinner and later won the Lithuanian league eight times. In 1997 (Helsinki), 1998 (Montevideo) and in 2001 (Ljubljana) he was a member of the Lithuania seniors basketball world champion team. Budnikas also won the European seniors championship in Riga in 2000.

He is a member of the Žalgiris board.

References

BC Žalgiris players
1944 births
Living people
Lithuanian men's basketball players